On Indivisible Lines (Greek Περὶ ἀτόμων γραμμῶν; Latin De Lineis Insecabilibus) is a short treatise attributed to Aristotle, but likely written by a member of the Peripatetic school some time before the 2nd century BC.

On Indivisible Lines seeks to refute Xenocrates' views on lines and minimal parts.

See also
Corpus Aristotelicum

References

External links
 

Works by Aristotle